Clare L. Berryhill (December 4, 1925 – March 18, 1996) was an American politician.

Berryhill was born in Fresno County, California. He lived in Ceres, California and was a grape grower. He served in the California State Assembly from 1969 to 1971 and in the California Senate from 1973 to 1977. Berryhill was a Republican. In 1983, Berryhill served as the Secretary of the California Department of Food and Agriculture. Berryhill died from cancer in Ceres, California. His sons Bill Berryhill and Tom Berryhill also served in the California Legislature.

Notes

1925 births
1996 deaths
People from Ceres, California
People from Fresno County, California
Farmers from California
California state senators
Members of the California State Assembly
Deaths from cancer in California
20th-century American politicians